This is a listing of the horses that finished in either first, second, or third place and the number of starters in the Marshua Stakes (1987–present), an American Thoroughbred Stakes race for fillies age three years-old at six furlongs run on dirt at Laurel Park Racecourse in Laurel, Maryland.

References

External links
 Laurel Park website

Lists of horse racing results
Laurel Park Racecourse